Aygun Ziyad gizi Samedzade (born January 11, 1967, Baku, Azerbaijan SSR) is an Azerbaijani composer and songwriter. She has been People's Artist of Azerbaijan since 2018.

Biography 
Aygun Samedzade was born on January 11, 1967, in Baku, Azerbaijan. She got her primary education at the Bulbul Music School, graduated with a gold medal and an individual scholarship in 1985. In the same year she entered to the Faculty of History and Theory of the Azerbaijan State Conservatory (now the Baku Music Academy), was a participant and winner of a number of republican and all-Union scientific conferences and competitions. She was awarded with a diploma in the competition that dedicated to the 100th anniversary of Uzeyir Hajibeyov, a gold medal for the best student's scientific work at the III Republican Scientific Conference and a first-class diploma in the competition that held among the countries of Caucasus. After graduating with Honorary Diploma and an individual scholarship named after Uzeyir Hajibeyov, she started working as a teacher at the Department of “History of Music”, taught the history of music in European countries, music culture of Turkic speaking peoples, music criticism and was an associate professor of the same department in the same year.

Composer, musicologist Aygun Samedzade has been a member of the Union of Composers of Azerbaijan since 2003. In 2003, Aygun Samedzade defended her Phd dissertation on the works of great Turkish composer Ahmet Adnan Saygun. In addition she is the author of a number of scientific articles and articles on the history of Azerbaijani music, including "The role of art patronage in Azerbaijan" ("Azərbaycanda sənət himayədarlığının rolu"), "Khurshudbanu Natavan and Azerbaijani culture" ("Xurşudbanu Natəvan və Azərbaycan mədəniyyəti"),"Shah Ismail Khatai and Azerbaijani culture"("Şah İsmayıl Xətai və Azərbaycan mədəniyyəti"), "Mir Movsun Navvab" ("Mir Mövsün Nəvvab"), "Haji Zeynalabdin Tagiyev's contribution to the development of Azerbaijan’s culture" ("Hacı Zeynalabdin Tağıyevin mədəniyyətimizin inkişafında xidmətləri"), "Some stylistic features of Adnan Saygun's work"("Adnan Sayqun yaradıcılığının bəzi üslub xüsusiyyətləri").

Aygun Samedzade is author of the more than 200 songs which has a special place in the repertoire of many famous singers. Many of these songs are concentrated in the album "Bu dünyanı nağıl bilək", the album "Əhməd Cavad", the album "Azərbaycan" which consisted of 4 discs and the album "Vətən mahnıları".

Aygun Samedzade also composed music for many theater performances and movies. She is the composer of the movies, including Elchin Afandiyev's "Killer", "Shakespeare", Huseyn Javid's "Amir Teymur", "Iblis", Ilgar Fahmi's "I am, I…", Stefan Zweig's "Letter from a Stranger Woman", "Additional Impact", "Mystery".

Aygun Samadzade is the author of "Turkestan", "Hasret, Gumsal", "Eshq" symphonies, vocal-choreographic composition named after Hazrat-i Fatima, Independence Anthem dedicated to the 100th anniversary of the Republic. She composed a series of songs such as the "Diaspora Anthem", "Can Azerbaijan", "Victory Song", "My Hero" during the war. One of the latest achievements of the composer is the project ("The end of longing") that dedicated to our victory in the Second Karabakh War. It should be pointed out that the video solution of the work took place in our liberated lands, therefore this can be considered one of the interesting initiatives in conveying Armenian vandalism to the world through art line.

Aygun Samedzade also created a series of works on Ahmad Javad’s poems, including "The Turkish cantata", "Ey Turk", "Bismillah", "Türk ordusuna", "Elin bayrağı", "Mən bulmuşam" and instrumental composition called "Sen aglama", romances "Niye gelmedin", "Qurban oldugum" and others. The premieres of these works took place on September 15, 2018, in Ankara, on November 10, 2018, in Baku, and on March 20, 2019, in Eskisehir. The works were performed by the Turkish Presidential Symphony Orchestra, the TRT Choir and the Azerbaijan State Symphony Orchestra. In the 2000, at "Best of Best “competition, her “Məktəb illəri", in 2002, at "Song of the songs Competition-Festival", "Bu dünyanı nağıl bilək", "Yağış" songs were awarded first places, and "Tut ağacım" was awarded the Grand Prix and Audience Choice Awards.

In 2008, a song called "Qelebe cal" was awarded first place by the National Olympic Committee, together with the Ministry of Culture and Tourism and the Union of Composers of Azerbaijan at the song contest on "Sports and Olympics". Many concert programs dedicated to her songs were organized at the Heydar Aliyev Palace in 2005, 2009, 2015, at the International Mugam Center in 2015, at the Silk Road International Music Festival in Sheki in 2017, at the Green Theater on the occasion of the 100th anniversary of the Republic on June 9, 2018.

Aygun Samedzade was the author and head of a number of television projects related to the promotion of Azerbaijani culture, including "Əslində Mən", "Bir mahnının tarixçəsi", "İntrada", "Ekspromt". In 2019, she was the author and project manager of the project called "Azerbaijan in 100 songs", consisting of songs about the homeland by Azerbaijani composers.

Aygun Samedzade has been the head of the NEFES Art Center since 2012.

On September 15, 2011, she was awarded the title of Honored Art Worker of the Republic of Azerbaijan, and on May 27, 2018, she was awarded the title of People's Artist of Azerbaijan.

Works

Songs

References

External links 
Instagram account
Facebook page
Youtube channel
Telegram channel

Azerbaijani musicians
Azerbaijani women pianists
Azerbaijani women singer-songwriters
1967 births
Living people